Anolis christophei, also known commonly as the big-fanned trunk anole and the King Christophe anole, is a species of lizard in the family Dactyloidae. The species is endemic to the island of Hispaniola.

Etymology
The specific name, christophei, refers to the Citadel of King Christophe near Cap-Haïtien, Haiti.

Geographic range
A. christophei is found in the Dominican Republic and Haiti.

Habitat

Description
Small for its genus, adults of A. christophei do not exceed  in snout-to-vent length (SVL).

Reproduction
A. christophei is oviparous.

References

Further reading
Schwartz A, Henderson RW (1991). Amphibians and Reptiles of the West Indies: Descriptions, Distributions, and Natural History. Gainesville, Florida: University of Florida Press. 714 pp. . (Anolis christophei, p. 236).
Schwartz A, Thomas R (1975). A Check-list of West Indian Amphibians and Reptiles. Carnegie Museum of Natural History Special Publication No. 1. Pittsburgh, Pennsylvania: Carnegie Museum of Natural History. 216 pp. (Anolis christophei, p. 73).
Williams EE (1960). "Notes on Hispaniolan Herpetology. 1. Anolis christophei, new species, from the Citadel of King Christophe, Haiti". Breviora (117): 1–7.

Anoles
Reptiles of Haiti
Reptiles of the Dominican Republic
Reptiles described in 1960
Taxa named by Ernest Edward Williams